The Portals or Arcs of Vitoria-Gasteiz were Medieval crenelated towers that fortified the entrances to a street of the city of Vitoria-Gasteiz (in Basque Country in Spain). This tower had a gateway in its center.

A cholera epidemic was used as a pretext to demolish these buildings, between 1854 and 1856. With this demolition, the city lost one of the most characteristic elements of the medieval Vitoria-Gasteiz.

City layout 

The eastern city walls had a single entry or access to the Portal del Rey's side, which closed with solid doors every night, as all streets of the city closed.

Access to union neighborhoods was protected by these gateways and corresponding towers.

These towers belonged to civilian Vitorian families who inhabited them and gave their surnames to these buildings.

See also
Second tower of the Plaza de la Virgen Blanca
List of missing landmarks in Spain

References

Demolished buildings and structures in Spain
Vitoria-Gasteiz
Former gates
Gates in Spain
Buildings and structures demolished in the 1850s